The Second is the second studio album by Canadian-American rock band Steppenwolf, released in October 1968 on ABC Dunhill Records. The album contains one of Steppenwolf's most famous songs, "Magic Carpet Ride". The background of the original ABC LP cover was a shiny "foil", in contrast to later (MCA Records) LP issues and the modern CD sleeve.

Featuring a style that incorporates psychedelic music and hard rock, the release has received critical acclaim both when it came out as well as in later years. For example, AllMusic critic Bruce Eder stated that, though "highly derivative" of their first album, The Second had "very hard and edgy" tracks with the band "in excellent form". It became the band's highest-charting album on the Billboard 200, reaching number three.

The five tracks on side two after "Magic Carpet Ride" consist of a continuous medley.

Track listing

Personnel

Steppenwolf
 John Kay – lead vocals, rhythm guitar, harmonica
 Michael Monarch – lead guitar
 Goldy McJohn – organ, piano
 Rushton Moreve – bass
 Jerry Edmonton – drums, vocals, lead vocals on "Faster Than the Speed of Life" and "28", co-lead vocals on "Don't Step on the Grass, Sam"

Technical
 Gabriel Mekler – producer 
 Bill Cooper – engineer
 Richard Podolor – engineer
 Gary Burden – art direction, cover design
 Henry Diltz – photography

Charts
Album - Billboard (United States)

Singles - Billboard (United States)

References

External links

steppenwolf.com Steppenwolf: The Second album

1968 albums
Steppenwolf (band) albums
ABC Records albums
Albums produced by Gabriel Mekler
Dunhill Records albums